Cilnia humeralis, common name wide-armed mantis, is an aggressive and very cannibalistic species of praying mantis from Africa.

A breeder in Great Britain describes C. humeralis as "a very stockily built species with huge forelegs; possibly the most powerful and aggressive species I have kept."

Subspecies
This species of mantis contains two subspecies.

Cilnia humeralis femoralis (Werner, 1906)
This subspecies of mantis is found in Tanzania.

Cilnia humeralis humeralis (Saussure, 1871)
This subspecies of mantis is found in Ethiopia, Mozambique, South Africa, Namibia.

Synonyms of this subspecies include:
Cilnia humeralis brevipennis (Schulthess-Rechberg, 1899)
Cilnia humeralis ignota (Rehn, 1904)
Cilnia humeralis latipes (Stal, 1876)

References

Mantidae
Mantodea of Africa
Insects of Ethiopia
Insects of Namibia
Insects of South Africa
Insects of Tanzania
Insects described in 1871